Saint Paraskevi (literally 'preparation' as the day of preparation for Sabbath, i.e. Friday) or (Aghia Paraskevi; ; ; ; ;) can refer to one of several saints. Variations of the name include Petka,  Paraskeva, Praskovia, Praskovie, Pyatnitsa, Pyetka, Paraskevoula, Paraschiva Voula, Vivi and Evi. 

Saints with the name (or variants) include:
Paraskevi of Rome, or Parasceva in Latin, 2nd-century martyr, feast day: July 26  
Paraskevi of Iconium (Paraskeva Pyatnitsa), 3rd-century virgin martyr venerated in Russia, feast day: October 28 
Parascheva of the Balkans (also known as Petka, Petca Parasceva, Paraskeva Pyatnitsa, Parascheva of Tirnovo, Parascheva the Serbian, Parascheva of Belgrade, Parascheva the New, Parascheva the Young, Parascheva of the Balkans, Paraskevi of Serbia), 11th century ascetic, feast day: October 14
Paraskevi, the sister of St. Photini the Samaritan Woman, feast day: March 20
, venerated in Slavic lands

Paraskevi